Scowen is a surname. Notable people with the surname include:

Charles T. Scowen (1852–1948), British photographer
Eric Frank Scowen (1910–2001), English physician
Jack Scowen (1935–2001), Canadian politician
Josh Scowen (born 1993), British footballer
Reed Scowen (1931–2020), Canadian business executive, author, and politician
Sam Scowen (born 1987), British paracanoeist and former adaptive rower